Aki Shimazaki (born 1954 in Gifu, Japan) is a Canadian novelist and translator. She moved to Canada in 1981, living in Vancouver and Toronto. Since 1991 she has lived in Montreal, where she teaches Japanese and publishes her novels in French.

Her second novel, Hamaguri, won the Prix Ringuet in 2000. Her fourth, Wasurenagusa, won the Canada-Japan Literary Prize in 2002. Her fifth, Hotaru, won the 2005 Governor General's Award for French fiction. Her books have been translated in English, Japanese, German, Hungarian, Italian and Russian.

Novels
Pentalogy "Le poids des secrets" :
 Tsubaki, 1999
 Hamaguri, 2000
 Tsubame, 2001
 Wasurenagusa, 2002
 Hotaru, 2005

Pentalogy "Au coeur du Yamato" :
 Mitsuba, 2006
 Zakuro, 2008
 Tonbo, 2010
 Tsukushi, 2012
 Yamabuki, 2013

Pentalogy "L'ombre du chardon" :
 Azami, 2014
 Hôzuki, 2015
 Suisen, 2016
 Fuki-no-tô, 2017
 Maïmaï, 2018

References

1954 births
Writers from Montreal
20th-century Canadian novelists
21st-century Canadian novelists
Japanese emigrants to Canada
Japanese women writers
People from Gifu
Living people
Canadian women novelists
Governor General's Award-winning fiction writers
Canadian writers of Asian descent
20th-century Canadian women writers
21st-century Canadian women writers
Canadian novelists in French
20th-century Canadian translators
21st-century Canadian translators
Writers from Gifu Prefecture
Canadian women non-fiction writers